The 1974 Holton Tennis Classic, also known as the St. Louis WCT, was a men's professional tennis tournament that was part of the blue Group of the 1974 World Championship Tennis circuit. It was held on indoor carpet courts at the Kiel Auditorium in St. Louis, Missouri in the United States. It was the fourth edition of the tournament and was held from April 22 through April 28, 1974. Second-seeded Stan Smith won his second consecutive singles title at the event and earned $10,000 first-prize money.

Finals

Singles
 Stan Smith defeated  Alex Metreveli 6–2, 3–6, 6–2
 It was Smith' 2nd singles title of the year and the 45th of his career in the Open Era.

Doubles
 Ismail El Shafei /  Brian Fairlie defeated  Ross Case /  Geoff Masters 7–6, 6–7, 7–6

References

External links
 ITF tournament edition details

Tennis in Missouri
1974 in American tennis